The Pulangi IV Hydroelectric Power Plant, also known as the Pulangi Dam, is located on the Pulangi River near Maramag in Bukidnon province on the island of Mindanao in the Philippines. It uses two reservoirs, produced by damming the Pulangi River, to supply water to a run-of-the-river hydroelectric power plant; the power plant is capable of generating  of power. Construction began in 1982; the first two generators became operational in December 1985, with the last generator being commissioned in 1986.

At the lower reservoir, water is fed to each of the three  Francis turbine-generators via a penstock. The Pulangi IV power plant provides 23% of the hydroelectric power generated on Mindanao.

Since operation, the reservoirs associated with the power plant have received an estimated  of sediment annually. Of the reservoir's combined  active capacity,  has been filled with silt. The siltation rate was almost 1 meter annually and caused the dam's reservoir to work at 50% capacity. The unexpected siltation threatens safe operation of the dams and power generation, in addition to drastically shortening the predicted operational lifespan of the dam. At first, the minimum and maximum water levels were raised and, in 2007, dredging work was performed around the head work of the upper reservoir's head. Selective dredging in the upper reservoir began in 2010, and continues as of 2011.

The artificial lake created by the reservoir proper is called the Pulangi Lake or the Maramag.

References

Energy infrastructure completed in 1986
Hydroelectric power plants in the Philippines
Run-of-the-river power stations
Buildings and structures in Bukidnon
1986 establishments in the Philippines
20th-century architecture in the Philippines